Sakae may refer to:

Places in Japan
 Sakae, Chiba (Japanese: 栄町; sakae-machi), a town in Chiba Prefecture
 Sakae, Niigata (Japanese: 栄町; sakae-machi), a town in Niigata Prefecture
 Sakae, Nagano (Japanese: 栄村; sakae-mura), a village in Nagano Prefecture
 Sakae-ku, Yokohama (Japanese: 栄区; sakae-ku), a ward of the city Yokohama, Kanagawa
 Sakae, Nagoya (Japanese: 栄; sakae), the downtown district of Nagoya (Naka-ku)

Other
 Sakae (given name)
 Sakae Ringyo, a Japanese manufacturer of bicycle parts
 Nakajima Sakae, a Japanese World War II radial aircraft engine

See also
Saka, an ancient people of Central Asia